Sarah Cathryn Ann Robson (née McFadden; born 23 May 1987) is a Northern Irish footballer who plays as a defender or striker for Durham in the FA Women's Championship.

Magherafelt-born Robson played in Northern Ireland for Moyola Park and Ballymena United Allstars. In 2005, she won a scholarship to University of Southern Mississippi and played varsity soccer for Southern Miss Golden Eagles. Following graduation she headed to the Icelandic Úrvalsdeild, where she played for Fylkir, then Grindavík.

At the end of the 2010 Icelandic season, Robson and international teammate Rachel Furness left Grindavík for Sunderland.

In June 2012 The Belfast Telegraph newspaper reported that three Northern Ireland players including Robson had been selected in the 18-player Great Britain squad for the 2012 London Olympics. But Robson quickly denied the report: "I haven't received anything about being in final squad... Wish it was true but unfortunately not." When the final squad was named, no Northern Irish or Welsh players were included.

On 13 January 2016, it was announced she was leaving Sunderland after five years serving the club and signing with Durham.

International goals

References

External links

1987 births
Living people
People from Magherafelt
Expatriate women's footballers in Iceland
Sunderland A.F.C. Ladies players
Women's Super League players
University of Southern Mississippi alumni
FA Women's National League players
Expatriate sportspeople from Northern Ireland in Iceland
Women's association footballers from Northern Ireland
Protestants from Northern Ireland
Northern Ireland women's international footballers
Southern Miss Golden Eagles women's soccer players
Sarah Robson
Sarah Robson
Women's association football central defenders
Women's association football forwards
Sarah Robson
Durham W.F.C. players
UEFA Women's Euro 2022 players